Moon Min-Kui (Hangul: 문민귀, born 15 November 1981) is South Korean footballer who plays as a midfielder.

In 2004, his first season, his team was runner-up K-League 2004. He helped this honor so he awarded Rookie of the Year award in spite of 1 goal and 2 assists. He has only one goal scored against Gwangju Sangmu Bulsajo in Hauzen Cup 2004 as Pohang Steelers player.

End of 2005 season, he was first contract player of newly formed Gyeongnam FC. But  cause of injuries and rehabilitation, he did not show his best play. He moved Suwon Samsung Bluewings in summer period.

Club career statistics

External links

1981 births
Living people
Association football midfielders
South Korean footballers
Pohang Steelers players
Gyeongnam FC players
Suwon Samsung Bluewings players
Jeju United FC players
K League 1 players
People from Suncheon
Sportspeople from South Jeolla Province